Zandberg is a hamlet in the Dutch province of Gelderland. It is a part of the municipality of Buren, and lies about 9 km northwest of Tiel.

Zandberg is not a statistical entity, and the postal authorities have placed it under Rijswijk. It was first mentioned in 1874 Zandberg and means sand hill. It consists of about 20 houses.

References
 

Populated places in Gelderland
Buren